Aggro Berlin was a German hip-hop independent record label based in Berlin that existed from 1 January 2001 until 1 April 2009. Three artists (Sido, Tony D and Kitty Kat) were signed with the label at the time of its closure.
Since the end of 2007, it used to be a sub-label of Universal.

"Aggro" is German slang for having an aggressive attitude (as in British English).

History 
The label was founded on 1 January 2001 by Berlin rappers Specter, Spaiche and Halil. The first signed artists were Sido and B-Tight. Later, the label also signed Bushido. The same year it released EP Das Mic und ich by A.i.d.S (formerly Royal TS) on the label, which was the first release of Aggro Berlin. In 2002 released the two samplers Aggro Ansage Nr. 1 and Aggro Ansage Nr. 2, which contains tracks by its signed artists. Fler was also featured on the second sampler, but he had not yet signed on to the label. Bushido and Fler released, in the same year, the collabo album, entitled Carlo Cokxxx Nutten.

In 2003, Aggro Berlin released Bushido's debut album Vom Bordstein bis zur Skyline, which was indexed by the BPjM (Federal Department for Media Harmful to Young Persons).

Later, in 2004, Sido's debut album, Maske sold more than 100,000 copies in less than a month. In September of that year, the rapper won a prestigious German music award for "Best Newcomer", but his album had been indexed.

In June 2004, Bushido left the label and signed with Universal.

G-Hot's contract ran out in Autumn 2006. After the song "Keine Toleranz" (No Tolerance) appeared on the internet in July 2007, Aggro Berlin renounced any further business association with him. The song, which featured Boss A, discriminates against homosexuals and calls to kill homosexuals. It was not officially released by any label and G-Hot stated that it had been recorded many years prior to its leak and was never intended to be released.

According to Sido and Fler in an interview with the German hip-hop magazine Juice, Aggro Berlin has not been a fully independent label since October 2007 but now collaborates with Universal Records.

Artists

Former acts

Releases

Albums

Singles

See also 
 List of record labels
 List of hip hop record labels

References

External links
 Official website (archived)

German independent record labels
Hip hop record labels
Music in Berlin
Mass media in Berlin
Companies based in Berlin